Loïc Pietri (born 27 August 1990) is a French judoka who competes in the 81 kg category. He won the world title in 2013, placing third in 2014 and second in 2015. At the 2016 Olympics he was eliminated in the first bout. His father, Marcel Pietri, won a silver medal at the 1986 European Championships.

Pietri worked as a television presenter for L'Équipe 21 during the 2015 Judo Grand Slam in Paris. In January 2016 he had an injury on right knee that took several months to recover.

References

External links

 
 

Living people
1990 births
French male judoka
World judo champions
Judoka at the 2015 European Games
European Games medalists in judo
European Games gold medalists for France
European Games bronze medalists for France
Judoka at the 2016 Summer Olympics
Olympic judoka of France
21st-century French people